Marek Roman Dąbrowski (born 28 November 1949) is a retired Polish foil fencer. He competed at the 1972 and 1976 Olympics and won a team gold medal in 1972, placing sixth individually. Between 1969 and 1974 he won six medals at the world championships.

References

1949 births
Living people
Polish male fencers
Olympic fencers of Poland
Fencers at the 1972 Summer Olympics
Fencers at the 1976 Summer Olympics
Olympic gold medalists for Poland
Olympic medalists in fencing
Sportspeople from Gliwice
Medalists at the 1972 Summer Olympics
Universiade medalists in fencing
Universiade bronze medalists for Poland
Medalists at the 1970 Summer Universiade
20th-century Polish people
21st-century Polish people